Ronald Cocks (1 August 1943 – 16 May 2017) was a Maltese footballer. He captained Malta's national football team 13 times, including in a match against England at Wembley in 1971.
 
Cocks played mainly for Gżira United and the Sliema Wanderers, and had a short spell with the Pittsburgh Phantoms in 1967. He also coached several Maltese clubs and was Maltese Player of the Year for the 1965/66 season.

References

External links
 
 
 Ronald Cocks, NASL

1943 births
2017 deaths
Association football forwards
Maltese footballers
Maltese football managers
Malta international footballers
Maltese Premier League players
National Professional Soccer League (1967) players
Gżira United F.C. players
Ħamrun Spartans F.C. players
Pittsburgh Phantoms players
Sliema Wanderers F.C. players